1961–62 was the 16th season of the Western International Hockey League.

Standings
 Trail Smoke Eaters     38		34	 4	 0				 299	134		 68	
 Nelson Maple Leafs     38		18	19	 1				 186	179		 37
 Kimberley Dynamiters   30		 9	20	 1				 120	173		 26¼
 Rossland Warriors      38		 9	29	 0				 142	264		 18

League awards
Howie Hornby, a centre with the Nelson Maple Leafs, won the Howard Anderson Memorial Trophy which is awarded annually to the league's most valuable and sportsmanlike player.

References 

Western International Hockey League seasons
Wihl
Wihl